The 1994 Colgate Red Raiders football team was an American football team that represented Colgate University during the 1994 NCAA Division I-AA football season. Colgate tied for second-to-last in the Patriot League.

In its second season under head coach Ed Sweeney, the team compiled a 3–8 record. Mike Boorman was the team captain.

The Red Raiders were outscored 253 to 174. Their 2–3 conference record tied for fourth (and second-worst) in the six-team Patriot League standings.

The team played its home games at Andy Kerr Stadium in Hamilton, New York.

Schedule

References

Colgate
Colgate Raiders football seasons
Colgate Red Raiders football